Raghu Raj Onta (born 16 August 1952) is a Nepalese sprinter. He competed in the men's 100 metres at the 1980 Summer Olympics.

References

External links
 

1952 births
Living people
Athletes (track and field) at the 1980 Summer Olympics
Nepalese male sprinters
Olympic athletes of Nepal
Place of birth missing (living people)
20th-century Nepalese people